The 1959 Italian Grand Prix was a Formula One motor race held at Monza on 13 September 1959. It was race 8 of 9 in the 1959 World Championship of Drivers and race 7 of 8 in the 1959 International Cup for Formula One Manufacturers. It was the 29th Italian Grand Prix and the 24th to be held at Monza. The race was held over 72 laps of the five-kilometre circuit for a total race distance of 414 kilometres.

The race was won by British driver Stirling Moss driving a Cooper T51 for the privateer Rob Walker Racing Team. Moss won by 46 seconds over American driver Phil Hill driving a Ferrari Dino 246 for Scuderia Ferrari. Championship points leader Australian Jack Brabham finished third in works entered Cooper T51, expanding his points lead, but not sufficiently to prevent a championship showdown with Moss and Ferrari driver Tony Brooks at the United States Grand Prix.

Race report 
This race was won on the weight of the cars, with Stirling Moss and team manager Rob Walker gambling on running the whole race without a tyre change in the little lightweight Cooper – although they substituted knock-on wheels for bolt-ons in case a pit stop was necessary. Stirling drove a careful race, relying on the Ferrari crew needing to pit. Tony Brooks made a good start but a piston failure eliminated him on the first lap. Graham Hill and then Dan Gurney led, but lost their advantages through clumsy pit-stop action. Moss continued to win at an average speed of 124 mph, a track record. Phil Hill was second for Ferrari on their home track, ahead of a Ferrari 4–5–6 in the order Gurney, Cliff Allison and Olivier Gendebien.

Moss's win closed the championship gap to only 5.5 points behind Jack Brabham with Brooks eight points behind Brabham. The combined efforts of Brabham, Moss, Maurice Trintignant, Bruce McLaren and Masten Gregory secured the Constructors' Championship for the Cooper Car Company.

Classification

Qualifying

Race 

Notes
 – Includes 1 point for fastest lap

Championship standings after the race 

Drivers' Championship standings

Constructors' Championship standings

 Notes: Only the top five positions are included for both sets of standings. Only the best 5 results counted towards each championship. Numbers without parentheses are championship points; numbers in parentheses are total points scored.

References

Italian Grand Prix
Italian Grand Prix
1959 in Italian motorsport